Krassimira Filipova (born 2 February 1949) is a former Bulgarian rhythmic gymnast. She was a leading athlete in the second half of the 1960s and early 1970s.

Career 
In 1967 she was at the World Championships held in Copenhagen where she obtained a bronze medal in the free hands final and was 7th in the individual All-Around event.

In 1971, at the World Championships in Havana, she won the silver medal with hoop, the bronze with rope, and was 4th place in the individual All-Around competition and in the ribbon final.

In the World Championships in Rotterdam in 1973, she was again 4th in the All-Around competition and won the silver medal in the hoop final; she in addition to 5th place with ball and 6th with rope.

Filipova was a national competitor for 11 years, and then became Neshka Robeva's assistant, and this experience marked an 18-year career as a national assistant coach, in the period from 1980 to 1998. The Bulgarian rhythmic gymnastics star graduated from UNSS , and later in 1972 and the coaching school at VIF (NSA). Six years later, she began to be famous as a Bulgarian judge, and is also the current Chairman of the Judges' Commission at the BFHG.

References 

1949 births
Living people
Bulgarian rhythmic gymnasts
Gymnasts from Sofia
Medalists at the Rhythmic Gymnastics World Championships